Lysefjord or Lysefjorden is a fjord located in the Ryfylke area in Rogaland county in southwestern Norway.

The name means light fjord, and is said to be derived from the lightly coloured granite rocks along its sides.  It is particularly well known for the huge Preikestolen cliff overlooking the fjord, which is a major tourist destination for the region.  The fairly isolated village of Lysebotn lies at the eastern end of the fjord and the villages of Forsand and Oanes both lie at the western end of the fjord near the Lysefjord Bridge, the only crossing of the fjord.

Geology
The fjord was carved by the action of glaciers in the ice ages and was flooded by the sea when the later glaciers retreated. The geology of Lysefjorden was thoroughly investigated and described by Professor Bjørn G. Andersen in his Master's thesis (1954)  (On the glacial retreat in the area between the Lysefjord and the Jøsenfjord in Ryfylke).

End to end, it measures  with rocky walls falling nearly vertically over  into the water. Not only is the fjord long and narrow, it is in places as deep as the mountains are high.

Population
Because of the inhospitable, mountainous terrain, the fjord is only lightly populated and only has two villages on its length - Forsand and Lysebotn, located at opposite ends of the fjord.  There is a small farming area on the north shore of the fjord, about halfway between the two ends. That farm area is accessible by road from the village of Årdal over the mountains to the north.  There are a few other very small, scattered settlements along the fjord, but those are only accessible by boat along the fjord.  There are no roads along the fjord since the sides of the fjord are too steep for roads.

Lysebotn, at the far eastern end of the fjord, is largely populated by workers at the nearby hydroelectric plants at Lyse and Tjodan, both built inside the mountains. The two power plants provide electricity for more than 100,000 people. A spectacular road which rises almost  through a series of 27 hairpin bends including a long hairpin tunnel inside the mountain is the only road access to Lysebotn from the outside world.

Gallery

Tourism
Lysefjorden is an extremely popular tourist attraction and day trip from the nearby city of Stavanger, from where cruise ships travel the full distance of the fjord. As well as the extraordinary scenery of the fjord itself, two points along its length are popular side trips. The Kjeragbolten is a famous boulder located at the Kjerag mountain. BASE jumping is legally allowed along the cliffs of the fjord.

Toilers of the Sea
French writer Victor Hugo wrote the novel, Toilers of the Sea, in which he admires the scenery of the fjord after a visit here in 1866.

See also 

 Lysebotn Hydroelectric Power Station
 Flørli Hydroelectric Power Station
 List of Norwegian fjords

References

External links 

 Lysefjord
 http://www.ryfylke.com
 Lysefjord and Lysebotn
 Lysefjorden Turist information
 Webcam from Lysefjorden
 Lysefjord Map Handy Map with comprehensive Trip explanation

Fjords of Rogaland
Strand, Norway
Sandnes